Laguna's 1st congressional district is one of the six congressional districts of the Philippines in the province of Laguna, formerly La Laguna. It has been represented in the House of Representatives of the Philippines since 1916 and earlier in the Philippine Assembly from 1907 to 1916. The district currently consists the northwestern city of San Pedro. It is currently represented in the 19th Congress by Ann Matibag of PDP-Laban (PDPLBN).

Representation history

Election results

2022

2019

2016

2013

2010

2007

2004

2001

1998

1995

See also
Legislative districts of Laguna

References

Congressional districts of the Philippines
Politics of Laguna (province)
1907 establishments in the Philippines
Congressional districts of Calabarzon
Constituencies established in 1907